The Nike of Paionios is an ancient statue of the Greek goddess of victory, Nike, made by sculptor Paionios 425-420 BC. Made of Parian marble, the medium gives the statue a translucent and pure white look to it. Found in pieces, the statue was restored from many fragments but is lacking face, neck, forearms, part of left leg, toes, and some fragments of drapery. It also had wings. The goddess is shown landing gently on her left foot, with the drapery blown against her body.  
 

The statue was installed to commemorate the victory of a land battle between Athens and Sparta in efforts to recapture the small island of Sphacteria from the Spartans in 425 BC, and then erected in 420 BC a few years after the victory. It was common for statues of Nike to be commissioned and put up after significant victories and achievements. The sculpture's location, on top of a tall plinth directly outside the Temple of Zeus would have ensured that it was seen by all Greeks who visited the sanctuary. It has the inscription: 
 

Vermeule et al. propose that in this competition, the winner would be the one to carve the sculpture of Nike, and it went to Paionios. His victory in the competition was likely the result of devising not only the most aesthetically pleasing option but also the most financially feasible. The second century AD travel writer Pausanias mentions the work in his description of Olympia, noting that it was 'by Paeonius, a native of Mende in Thrace."

Original location 
The statue was excavated at Olympia in 1875–76, in the area of Elis, Greece. The statue originally stood near the temple of Zeus on a triangular 6-metre high pillar. It would have been placed at the southwest corner of the temple, above the Sacred Way. The pedestal that this figure would have originally sat on is still in situ in Olympia. Including the pillar, the statue stood at 12 metres,  without the pillar the statue stands at 198 cm tall. The placement of this dedicatory statue at Olympia, considered Spartan ground, is most often interpreted by scholars as a deliberate and assertive act of dominance.

Description 
Nike was by far the most common winged goddess portrayed in Classical art, and aside from her wings, her most consistently recognizable attribute- in both Athens and outside, seems to have been her flying drapery. This sculpture was designed to stand atop a column and be seen from below, as one would walk up along the path to the temple. Nike stands on a cloud of marble, furthering the idea that she is in the sky and among the clouds, coming down to Earth. Nike is of the Classical period/style, which we can see through her drapery, in what is called florid style, evident in how tightly the material is folded and clinging to her body. Nike carries her himation, while she wears a chiton. Her long peplos garment has had one of the pins at the shoulders come undone, letting the drapery slip revealing her left breast. In combination with the wind blowing around her, the drapery clings to her eluding to the shape of her torso and delicate maiden body. For this time, the amount of skin that Paionios chose to reveal on this figure was "shockingly erotic" for the society it was created in. The fabric billows around and in between the legs, covering them but also enhancing them to the viewer.  Her drapery gains substance only off the body, in which billowing folds are the heart of the composition and its meaning. Her draperies, blown by the wind, form a background for her figure. The goddess is represented in descending flight, positioned upon a triangular pedestal about thirty feet high, she seems all but independent of support. Below Nike's feet and flying to the viewer's left is an eagle, a bird closely associated with Zeus and directly referencing the god. The eagle at her feet suggests the element through which she moves. It inspires a sense of buoyancy, speed, and grace, shown through how the rapid flight throws back her drapery to reveal her form.

Paionios combined both Ionian and Doric traditions in this monument. The erection of an offering on a high pillar is of Ionian origin, as the Dorians tended to use lower bases. By placing a well-known, generic image of triumph upon a pillar to symbolize a specific Victory, Paionios added to this tradition. The Ionians also favored marble more often, yet the Nike wears a Dorian peplos. Her left arm is and would have been raised upholding her Himation, and her right would have been lowered. To those walking up to this statue along the sacred way, she may have been holding her hand out to the viewer in an uplifting and inspiring manner. Her wings, large and mostly missing in the original, would have extended up and back, which we can see from pieces still attached at her shoulders. This is a key feature that most, if not all depictions of Nike had. Like her iconic drapery, Nike's wings were just as tied to her image. There are other Nike sculptures still with wings, like Nike of Samothrace.

She is in the round, meaning that the viewer would be able to walk around on all sides of the statue. This is evident in that all sides of Nike show a different feature, and that viewing it from all sides gives you a complete picture. This Nike statue itself would have originally stood at about 1.96 m, or 6 ft 1 in tall, making her over life-size. This would have been important as she would have been high up on the pedestal, and away from the viewer's direct line of sight. By making her larger than life, this makes her more legible from the ground while also placing emphasis on her importance. The stance that this Nike takes marks a transition from older depictions of Nike that had her kneeling sideways to having her coming forwards towards the viewer, engaging directly. 

Like many sculptures of this time period, there is evidence that this sculpture would have been painted. The painted colors of the drapery would have contrasted with her white flesh, which would have emphasized just how much of her skin was out in view (i.e. her leg and her left breast). The paint also adds a way of defining the features, as in some spots the drapery lies flat against the body, and the paint along the ridges would have defined the fabric and the skin. The pedestal that Nike sits atop of would have originally been painted blue, so that Nike would appear that she was flying down, amplified by the windswept appearance of her clothes, cloud, and Eagle. Her Chiton, or peplos, shows evidence that it would have been painted red.

Copies 
There have been many copies made of this, and many recreations. For example, there has been a full-body recreation of this sculpture, which was a cast of an original. This example of a plaster cast can be seen at the Wilcox Classical Museum, with her face, wings, and legs intact.

There has been another recreation, in which a full 3D model of this has been created and open to explore online. This allows for viewing of all sides of this, as one could in person, and get the full roundabout picture.

Related 
In the 2004 Athens Olympic medals the front side of the medal presents the statue of Nike Paionios with ancient Olympia in the backdrop, while the other side of the medal features the eternal flame framed by the first verse of the eighth Olympic Hymn (Olympic Anthem) by Pindar along with the logo of the Athens Games.

-1919, Paionios' Nike was used on Panionios shields.

Nike of Samothrace, another statue shows another depiction of Nike and how she may have been seen.

See also 
 Athena Nike

References 

Wikipedia Student Program

1870s archaeological discoveries
5th-century BC Greek sculptures
Marble sculptures in Greece
Sculptures of Nike
Sculptures of women in Greece
Olympia, Greece
Archaeological discoveries in Greece